Beverley Road (known in local parlance as Bev Road) is one of several major roads that run out of the city of Hull in the East Riding of Yorkshire, England. The road is noted for being a major arterial route into, and out of Hull. It also known for its student population and being the location of a shop (Turners), whose slogan was used by the pop band, Everything But the Girl.

History
Beverley Road was in existence by 1305, when King Edward I built the radial routes into the port of Hull to effect free trade. Beverley Road now runs North from Hull city centre, at the junction of Ferensway, Freetown Way and Spring Bank, and carries the designation of A1079. Upon leaving the city boundaries, Beverley Road continues north towards the town of Beverley becoming the A1174. After passing through the village of Dunswell it becomes Hull Road. Ferensway was opened in 1931 (named after T. R. Ferens, a Hull benefactor), and provide access from the bottom of Beverley Road to Hull Paragon railway station.

A horse tramway was opened on the road in 1875. It extended from Prospect Place all the way to the junction with Clough Road, in the Newland area. The junction of Clough Road (and opposite, Cottingham Road), was designated as the northern limit of the Beverley Road conservation area in 1994.

Beverley Road is home to a significant proportion of Hull's student community, given its proximity to the University of Hull, and the former Humberside campus of the University of Lincoln. Its shopping and nightlife is comparable to thoroughfares in neighbouring cities such as  Sheffield's Ecclesall Road and Leeds' Headingley. It has a high number of pubs and other businesses catering for both the student and local communities.

In parts, it is lined with large pre-war housing, but extensive bombing during the Second World War destroyed many such buildings. Endeavour Learning and Skills Centre is on Beverley Road, on the site of the former Kingston General Hospital.

Many major national and international chains have businesses along the length of Beverley Road including pub chains such as Wetherspoons, Hogshead, and Scream, as have high street chains like Tesco, Sainsbury's at Jacksons (now Sainsbury's Local), and Cooplands. Beverley Road has many food shops catering for the cosmopolitan local community, including Arabic, Indian, Italian, Kurdish and Polish.

Beverley Road Baths was opened in 1905, and underwent a £3.75 million refurbishment from June 2020 until reopening in August 2021. The baths are a Grade II Listed building.

The pop duo Everything But the Girl (EBTG), Ben Watt and Tracey Thorn, took their band name from Turners furniture shop on Beverley Road. The name EBGT was emblazoned on the shop front sign.

It is officially known as Beverley High Road, north of Cottingham Road. Whilst within the Hull boundaries, Beverley Road runs through the parliamentary constituency of Hull North.

See also 
Closed cinemas in Kingston upon Hull

References

Sources

Transport in Kingston upon Hull
Roads in Yorkshire
Streets in Kingston upon Hull